Klaas Henderikus Willem Knot (born 14 April 1967, in Bedum, Netherlands) is a Dutch economist and central banker, who is the current President of the Dutch central bank De Nederlandsche Bank (DNB). In this capacity he also serves as a member of the Governing Council of the European Central Bank, and of the Board of Governors of the International Monetary Fund. Knot also holds a position as Professor in Monetary Stability at the University of Amsterdam and honorary professor at the University of Groningen.

Early life and education
Knot was born in the town of Bedum near Groningen. After completing his secondary education (vwo) at the Andreas College in Drachten, he studied economics at the University of Groningen. In 1995 he was awarded a doctorate from the same institution, with his doctoral thesis concerning the differences in budget deficits and interest rates on government bonds between Members States of the European Union.

Career
After obtaining his doctorate Knot began working as a Senior Economist at De Nederlandsche Bank in the Department of Monetary and Economic Policy. In 1998 he left this post to become an economist in the European Department of the International Monetary Fund in Washington D.C. A year later, he returned to De Nederlandsche Bank, as the Head of Banking and Supervisory Strategies Department. After serving in this capacity for three years, in December 2002 he left De Nederlandsche Bank again to become the Director of the Dutch Pensions and Insurance Authority, charged with supervision of all Dutch pension funds and insurance companies. In 2004 the Pensions and Insurance Authority was merged with De Nederlandsche Bank, and Knot was appointed as Director of the Supervisory Policy Division at De Nederlandsche Bank. In 2009 he left De Nederlandsche Bank once more to become Director of Financial Markets, and Deputy Treasurer General of the Dutch Ministry of Finance. Knot was the Vice Chairman of the Financial Stability Board from 2018 to 2021 when he replaced Randal Quarles as Chairman.

Other activities

International organizations
 European Central Bank (ECB), Ex-Officio Member of the Governing Council
 European Systemic Risk Board (ESRB), Ex-Officio Member
 Bank for International Settlements (BIS), Ex-Officio Member of the Board of Directors
 International Monetary Fund (IMF), Ex-Officio Member of the Board of Governors

Non-profit organizations
 Trilateral Commission, Member of the European Group
 Teylers Museum, Member of the Supervisory Board

Personal life
Knot is married and has two children. He currently lives in Amsterdam, which is where De Nederlandsche Bank is headquartered.

References

|-

1967 births
21st-century Dutch economists
Dutch civil servants
Living people
People from Bedum
Presidents of the Central Bank of the Netherlands